The Hiram Palmer House is a historic house located at 703 East Fort Street in Farmington, Illinois. Hiram and Philynder Palmer built the house in 1851–52 but sold it the year it was completed. In 1856, the house was purchased by Riley Bristol, a local pharmacist and founder of Farmington's First Congregational Church; Bristol lived in the house until 1882. The house has a Greek Revival design, a nationally popular stylistic choice in the first half of the nineteenth century. The wraparound front porch is supported by Tuscan columns. The house's low hip roof features a plain frieze and cornice at the roof line and is topped by a lantern with a cornice and pediment. The house's interior features decorative Greek Revival woodwork, including carved door and window moldings, ornamental panels by the windows, and a fireplace mantel supported by pilasters.

The house was added to the National Register of Historic Places on May 20, 1999.

References

Houses on the National Register of Historic Places in Illinois
Greek Revival architecture in Illinois
Houses completed in 1852
National Register of Historic Places in Fulton County, Illinois
1852 establishments in Illinois